Oi Va Voi is a studio album by the English, London-based, experimental band Oi Va Voi, released in 2007.

Critical reception
AllMusic wrote that the album "saw Oi Va Voi embracing their peculiarities and creating a swirling mix of rock music, soulful electronica, and world music influences." The Guardian wrote that the band "excel here at everything from an Air-style 'kitsch space song' about Yuri Gagarin via skittering beats, Arabic strings and Jewish klezmer to the sensitive 'Dry Your Eyes.'" Drowned in Sound called it "an astoundingly bland, wearingly tedious long-player, with precious little to recommend it."

Track listing

Personnel
Alice McLaughlin - lead vocals
Lemez Lovas - lyrics, arrangement, trumpet, vocals
Nik Ammar - guitar
Josh Breslaw - drums
Stephen Levi - clarinet
Leo Bryant - bass
Anna Phoebe - violin

References

External links
 BBC review

Oi Va Voi albums
2007 albums
Experimental music albums